Shëngjin (Albanian for Saint Jean)is a village in the former municipality of Shëngjergj in Tirana County, Albania. At the 2015 local government reform it became part of the municipality Tirana.

Demographic history
Shëngjin is recorded in the Ottoman defter of 1467 as a village belonging to the region of Tamadhea in the vilayet of Çermenika. Shëngjin was a relatively settlement with only five households which were represented by the following household heads: Andrija Rili, Gjon Menkoli, Petër Mizijo, Gjon Pigonti, and Gjon Bashka.

References

Populated places in Tirana
Villages in Tirana County